The 1924–25 season was Galatasaray SK's 21st in existence and the club's 15th consecutive season in the Istanbul Football League.

Squad statistics

Competitions

İstanbul Football League

Semifinals

Final

Friendly matches
Kick-off listed in local time (EEST)

Match officials
Assistant referees:
Unknown
Unknown

Match rules
90 minutes

References
 Futbol, Galatasaray. Tercüman Spor Ansiklopedisi vol.2 (1981) (page 560)
 1924-1925 İstanbul Futbol Ligi. Türk Futbol Tarihi vol.1. page(46). (June 1992) Türkiye Futbol Federasyonu Yayınları.
 Tuncay, Bülent (2002). Galatasaray Tarihi. Page (117) Yapı Kredi Yayınları

External links
 Galatasaray Sports Club Official Website 
 Turkish Football Federation - Galatasaray A.Ş. 
 uefa.com - Galatasaray AŞ

Galatasaray S.K. (football) seasons
Turkish football clubs 1924–25 season
1920s in Istanbul